Conan the Valorous is a fantasy novel  by American writer John Maddox Roberts, featuring Robert E. Howard's sword and sorcery hero Conan the Barbarian. It was first published in trade paperback by Tor Books in September 1985; a regular paperback edition followed from the same publisher in September 1986, and was reprinted in January 1992. The first British edition was published in paperback by Sphere Books in September 1987.

The book also includes "Conan the Indestructible", L. Sprague de Camp's chronological essay on Conan's career.

Plot
Hathor-Ka, a Stygian sorceress, tricks Conan into travelling to Ben Morgh, a sacred mountain in Cimmeria and into performing a simple spell to transport her there. His expedition takes him across Koth, Nemedia, and the Border Kingdoms where Conan is diverted by his rescue of a chieftainess. Meanwhile, Jaganath (a sorcerer from Vendhya) is also on a journey into the Cimmerian Wilderness, escorted by Vanir. In Cimmeria, the various clans are uniting against supernatural monsters. As the conflict rages on, Conan and a wizard from Khitai wage a more crucial battle inside Crom's Cave beneath the mountain involving Jaganath and Hathor-Ka. Ultimately, Cimmeria is delivered from outside sorcery and Conan joins a raiding party of Aesir in their journey towards Hyberborea.

Reception
Don D'Ammassa, writing of Roberts' Conan novels, noted that "[a]lthough Roberts did not recreate Howard's character exactly, making him more intellectual and less inclined to solve every problem by hitting it with a sword, his evocation of the barbaric setting is superior to that of most of the other writers contributing to the series." He calls this novel, "the author's first Conan pastiche, one of the better entries in the series, and the closest view we see of the land [of] Cimmeria except for the Conan novel by Harry Turtledove."

Writing of some other Tor Conan novels, reviewer Ryan Harvey called Roberts "the most consistently successful of its stable of authors," and "the most consistently entertaining" of them, showing "deft ability with storytelling and action scenes, and a thankful tendency not to overplay his hand and try to ape Robert E. Howard's style."

References

External links
Page at Fantastic Fiction

1985 American novels
1985 fantasy novels
Conan the Barbarian novels
American fantasy novels
Tor Books books